Phalangeal articulations of foot may refer to:
Metatarsophalangeal articulations
Interphalangeal articulations of foot